One man athlete from Tunisia competed at the 1992 Summer Paralympics in Barcelona, Spain.

Team 
Tunisia sent one sportsperson to the Barcelona Games, athlete Kais El-Bokri.

Athletics 
El-Bokri competed in the Men's 100 m TS4 event.  Competing in heat 2, he finished ninth in a nine deep field in a time of 13.56 seconds.

See also
Tunisia at the Paralympics
Tunisia at the 1992 Summer Olympics

References 

Nations at the 1992 Summer Paralympics
1992
Summer Paralympics